Football in Cuba is run by the Asociación de Fútbol de Cuba. The association administers the national football team, as well as the Campeonato Nacional.

Football is the second most popular sport in Cuba after baseball.  It has been very popular among young people and the new generations in Cuba.

History

The first recorded football match in Cuba was in 1901. Football has struggled as sport in Cuba since Baseball is the number one sport in the country. Since the 21st Century football has enjoyed a surge of popularity amongst the youth since Raúl Castro eased restrictions media, allowing international football to be televised starting with the 2010 World Cup.
 La Liga and particularly Real Madrid and Barcelona are popular amongst the youth.

Professional football
Professional sports have been forbidden by the Cuban government since 1961, but in 2016, Maikel Reyes became the first Cuban to be allowed to sign a professional contract with a foreign team when he joined Mexican third-tier side Cruz Azul Premier. Until then, Cuban footballers who played professionally had done so without approval of the country's football association and after fleeing the country.

League system

Campeonato Nacional de Fútbol de Cuba is largely amateur league where 16 teams are split into four groups of four teams.

2019

National team

Cuba have only qualified for the world cup once in  1938 and were eliminated in the quarter finals. They lost 8-0 to Sweden.

Traditionally is one of the weakest teams in CONCACAF but since the 21 century has seen significant improvement qualifying for the Gold Cup and reaching the quarter finals in 2015 and 2017.

In 2021 only amateurs with contracted to INDER (Instituto Nacional de Deportes, Educación Fisica y Recreación)  were permitted, now Cuban professional players from abroad are recruited to improve the national football team.

References